FC Zhivoye Pivo is a Kyrgyzstani football club based in Kant, Kyrgyzstan that played in the second division in Kyrgyzstan. It's a farm club of FC Abdish-Ata Kant.

History 
2004: Founded as FC Zhasztyk Kant.
2006: Renamed to FC Schastlivyi Den Kant.
2009: Renamed to FC Zhivoye Pivo Kant.

Zhivoye Pivo reached the Kyrgyzstan Cup quarterfinal for the first time in 2005.

Achievements 
Kyrgyzstan League:

Kyrgyzstan Cup:
Quarterfinalist: 2005, 2009, 2015

Current squad

References

External links 
 Profile at footballfacts.ru

Football clubs in Kyrgyzstan
2004 establishments in Kyrgyzstan